Star in My Heart was a 1997 Korean drama series run on MBC.  One of the earlier Korean dramas to air outside Korea, as part of what became known as the Korean Wave, it was very popular and helped its cast (particularly Ahn Jae-wook) become widely recognized., The drama also marked  Jeon Do-yeon's final small screen appearance prior to transition in the big screen with The Contact later that year.

Story 
Orphan Lee Yun-hee (Choi Jin-sil) is adopted into a hostile family environment. She harbors an undiscovered artistic talent, which helps to catapult her into the lives of two men. She was taken to her father's friend family, after her father died, although while his father's friend had warm feeling towards her she was met with hostility from her new stepmother (Park Won-sook) and her stepsister Ahn Yi-hwa (Jo Mi-ryung), who throughout the series are intriguing with against her. She becomes engaged in a relationship with a young, promising star Kang Min-hee (Ahn Jae-wook) a son of a rich businessman who's against his only son being a singer because it doesn't uphold to his values of a good occupation a man should be busy with. Lee Joon-hee (Cha In-pyo), who's a lead designer in one of the fashion houses, becomes a friend of Yun-hee and eventually helps her to make a career as a designer as well.

Cast 
Choi Jin-sil as Lee Yun-hee
Ahn Jae-wook as Kang Min-hee
Cha In-pyo as Lee Joon-hee
Jeon Do-yeon as Soon-ae
Jo Mi-ryung as Ahn Yi-hwa
Park Won-sook as Mrs. Song
Lee Young-hoo as Mr. Ahn
Park Chul as Ahn Yi-ban
Oh Ji-myung as Min-hee's father
Sunwoo Yong-nyeo as Min-hee's mother
Maeng Sang-hoon as Heo Kwang-young
Kang Nam-gil as Han Jae-bong
Yoo Tae-woong as Joon-young
Han Seung-yeon as orphan

See also 
List of Korean television shows
Contemporary culture of South Korea

References

External links
 
 
 Star in My Heart at YA Entertainment

Korean-language television shows
AZN Television original programming
1997 South Korean television series debuts
1997 South Korean television series endings
MBC TV television dramas
1990s South Korean television series
South Korean romance television series